Mathias Coureur (born 22 March 1988 in Fort-de-France) is a Martiniquais professional footballer who plays as a forward for Golden Lion.

Career
Born in Martinique, Coureur started his professional career in France, playing for Beauvais, Nantes B and Gueugnon, before moving to Spanish side Orihuela in 2010. He later spent one-and-a-half seasons with fellow Segunda División B club Atlético Baleares. With Baleares, he won the 2011–12 Segunda División B Group III title. In early 2013 Coureur returned to his country to play for Golden Lion.

After successful 5 months in the Martinique Championnat National, Coureur joined Huracán Valencia in July 2013. He made his debut in a 1–1 away draw against Reus Deportiu on 25 August. Coureur scored his first goal for Huracán on 14 September, in a 4–0 home win over Elche Ilicitano.

Cherno More Varna
On 16 June 2014, Coureur signed with Bulgarian side Cherno More Varna on a two-year deal. He made his debut in a 0–0 home draw against Ludogorets Razgrad on 26 July, coming on as a substitute for Daniel Georgiev. On 31 May 2015, Coureur scored the winning goal in the 119th minute of the 2015 Bulgarian Cup Final against Levski Sofia, giving Cherno More their first ever Bulgarian Cup trophy. With Varna, he also won the 2015 Bulgarian Supercup. He finished the 2014–15 season as the club's top scorer with 9 goals in all competitions.

Dinamo Tbilisi
On 28 May 2016, after his contract with Cherno More expired, Coureur joined Georgian champions Dinamo Tbilisi. He left the club, however, shortly after that on a mutual agreement, after his team failed to qualify for the group stages of the European competitions. He appeared in 2 matches for Dinamo Tbilisi in the Umaglesi Liga.

Lokomotiv GO
He returned to Bulgaria, playing for newly promoted A PFG club Lokomotiv GO during the autumn of 2016.

Kaisar
On 13 January 2017, Coureur signed with Kazakh club Kaisar.

Cherno More Varna (second spell)
On 15 January 2020, he returned to his former club Cherno More Varna and was greeted positively by the fans of the team. He scored his first hat-trick for the club on 16 August 2020 in a game against Etar Veliko Tarnovo Coureur topped the goalscoring charts in the league before the winter break, netting 15 times.

Samsunspor
In January 2021, he signed a contract with Turkish team Samsunspor.

NorthEast United
On 18 September 2021, he joined Indian Super League side NorthEast United FC on a one-year deal. He made his ISL debut on 20 November against Bengaluru FC in a 4–2 loss, in which he scored a goal. He left the club on 7 January 2022, due to personal issues.

Cherno More Varna (third spell)
In January 2022 it was confirmed that Coureur will once again become part of the Cherno More team.

International career
In June 2013, Coureur was named in the 23-man Martinique squad for the 2013 CONCACAF Gold Cup. He made his debut in the championship on 7 July in the first group game against Canada, coming on for the last 9 minutes in place of Yoann Arquin. On 12 July, Coureur started in Martinique's second group game, a 1–0 defeat to Panama.

On 3 September 2014, Coureur scored his first international goal in a 6–0 win over Bonaire during the 2014 Caribbean Cup qualifying. In November 2014, he was named in Martinique's squad for the finals of 2014 Caribbean Cup in Jamaica.

Personal life
In January 2022, Coureur tested positive for COVID-19.

Career statistics

Club

International goals
Scores and results list Martinique's goal tally first.

Honours
Atlético Baleares
Segunda División B (Group III): 2011–12
Cherno More
 Bulgarian Cup: 2014–15
 Bulgarian Supercup: 2015

References

External links
 
 

1988 births
Living people
French footballers
French expatriate footballers
Martiniquais footballers
Martinique international footballers
Martiniquais expatriate footballers
AS Beauvais Oise players
FC Gueugnon players
Orihuela CF players
CD Atlético Baleares footballers
Huracán Valencia CF players
PFC Cherno More Varna players
FC Dinamo Tbilisi players
FC Lokomotiv Gorna Oryahovitsa players
FC Kaisar players
Seongnam FC players
NorthEast United FC players
Samsunspor footballers
Tercera División players
First Professional Football League (Bulgaria) players
Kazakhstan Premier League players
K League 1 players
TFF First League players
Expatriate footballers in Spain
Expatriate footballers in Bulgaria
Expatriate footballers in Kazakhstan
Expatriate footballers in South Korea
Expatriate footballers in Turkey
Expatriate footballers in India
French expatriate sportspeople in Spain
French expatriate sportspeople in Bulgaria
French expatriate sportspeople in Kazakhstan
French expatriate sportspeople in South Korea
French expatriate sportspeople in Turkey
French expatriate sportspeople in India
Martiniquais expatriate sportspeople in Spain
Martiniquais expatriate sportspeople in Bulgaria
Martiniquais expatriate sportspeople in Kazakhstan
Martiniquais expatriate sportspeople in South Korea
Martiniquais expatriate sportspeople in Turkey
Martiniquais expatriate sportspeople in India
2013 CONCACAF Gold Cup players
2014 Caribbean Cup players
Association football midfielders
Sportspeople from Fort-de-France
Indian Super League players